Razia Rahimtoola (born Razia A. K. Gul-Mohammad in Bombay on 29 August 1919; died 13 November 1988 in Karachi) was a Chair of Pediatrics Jinnah Post Graduate Medical Centre, Karachi. She was the first woman to be elected a fellow of the Royal College of Physicians.

Education and career
She graduated M.B.B.S. from Grant Medical College in 1942 followed by which she worked as house physician for six months in J.J. Hospital Bombay.

She was then commissioned in the I.M.S/L.A.M.C. and rose to the rank of acting Major functioning as a graded physician. Following partition of the sub-continent in 1947 she resigned from the commission and proceeded to the United Kingdom for postgraduate studies. She secured her D.C.H. London in 1951 followed by M.R.C.P. Edinburgh in 1953. During her stay in the United Kingdom she also worked as Senior House Officer and Senior Registrar in South Wales.

Upon return to Pakistan in 1953 Dr. Rahimtoola was appointed as Assistant Professor of Medicine, Dow Medical College and Associate Physician, Civil Hospital, Karachi. It was during this period (1962) that she qualified for a Fulbright Grant and hence received training in Pediatrics Cardiology under Helen Tausiq at Johns Hopkins, Baltimore, United States.

Towards the end of 1963 Dr. Razia was appointed in Pediatrics at the Jinnah Post Graduate Medical Centre Karachi. She was awarded the F.R.C.P. in 1964. Following retirement of Prof. Hamid M. Khan in 1972 she was selected as Chair of Pediatrics, JPMC. During this period she was also conferred Fellowship by the College of Physicians and Surgeons Pakistan. She was also conferred the gold medal by the President of Pakistan for her contributions towards Child Health and Pediatrics.

Research and publications
Razia Rahimtoola was involved in publication works which covered subjects in General Medicine and Pediatrics including Hypertrophic pulmonary osteoarthropathy, post-vaccinial encephalomyelitis tuberculosis meningitis, amoebiasis, scleroderma, Congenital abnormalities in the new-born, Thalassaemia and other hematological disorders in children, Cerebral Palsy in children, Perinátal mortality etc. published in Pakistani Journals and International journals such as Acta Paediatrica. Dr Rahimtoola devoted her time to under nutrition and malnutrition in children in Khudadad Colony, Mahmudabad, Karachi with some assistance from the Pakistan Medical Research Council and published her findings. She was a contributor to Ilyas and Ansari's Text Book on Community Medicine and to the Text Book of Pediatrics for Developing Countries edited by Wasti, Arif and Hanif. Her most monumental work is a tome on Pediatrics which she had edited and prepared with the help of many collaborators.

Accolades
Razia Rahimtoola was noted as a 'teacher to remember' for her detailed studies on infant and child nutrition.

Professor Rahimtoola was described as a 'jewel' for her work towards humanity and the medical profession in general.

Personal life

She was married to a lawyer based out of Karachi. They did not have any children. She died after a difficult illness.

Her father in law, Hoosenaly Rahimtoola was a well known Legislator of the Bombay Presidency in British India.

Awards
 Gold Medal for contributions to Pediatrics by President of Pakistan

References

Further reading

1919 births
1988 deaths
Pakistani paediatricians
Medical doctors from Mumbai
People from Karachi
Fellows of the Royal College of Physicians of Edinburgh
Pakistani people of Gujarati descent
20th-century Indian women scientists
20th-century Indian medical doctors
Indian Ismailis
Pakistani Ismailis
Women scientists from Maharashtra